Clover Hill High School is a public secondary school located in Midlothian, an unincorporated community in Chesterfield County, Virginia, United States. It is part of Chesterfield County Public Schools and is located at 13301 Kelly Green Lane. The school opened in 1972 and moved to its present location in 2010.

Academics

Clover Hill houses the Chesterfield County Mathematics and Science High School, which opened in 1994.

Clover Hill's World Language department offers six different languages: French, German, Japanese, Spanish, Chinese, and Latin.

Athletics
The school's sports teams compete in the Virginia High School League's AAA Dominion District. The school colors are green and gold, and the school's mascot is the Cavalier.
In 2009, Clover Hill became the first high school to win three Virginia state championships in boys' volleyball. They also won championships in 2001 and 2005. In 2013 & 2014, the competition cheerleading team took home the conference 12 championships. They also competed at the regional level in 2013 & 2014.

Overcrowding
Due to overcrowding at Clover Hill, a new high school, Cosby High School, opened in 2006 in the western part of the county. A new Clover Hill High School, located a bit farther east, opened in 2010 and has replaced the old CHHS.

Notable alumni
Brittany Lang – Professional golfer
Bryan Tucker – Saturday Night Live writer
Chantel Jones – Professional soccer player
Doc Ish (real name: Sean McHugh) – Grammy winner, music producer
Kellee Santiago – Video game designer
Randall Munroe – Webcomic artist (xkcd)
Flattus Maximus (real name: Cory Smoot) – Former guitarist for rock band GWAR

References

External links
Mathematics and science center
Clover Hill High School

 

Public high schools in Virginia
Schools in Chesterfield County, Virginia